The discography of American singer
Tiffany Young consists of two extended plays, ten singles (including eight as featured artist), and twelve soundtrack appearances. She debuted as a member of South Korean girl group Girls' Generation in August 2007 and has since achieved immense popularity on the Asian music scene. Tiffany is also a member of the Girls' Generation subgroup TTS and has recorded tracks for soundtracks for various television drama series and films.

Her career as a solo artist began in May 2016 with the release of her debut extended play I Just Wanna Dance. The EP peaked at number three on the Gaon Album Chart and has sold over 63,154 copies in South Korea. The title track, "I Just Wanna Dance", peaked at numbers ten and eight on the Gaon Digital Chart and the Billboard World Digital Songs, respectively. In June 2016, Tiffany released a song titled "Heartbreak Hotel", which was a promotional single for S.M. Entertainment's digital music platform SM Station.

Although she continues to be a member of Girls' Generation, Tiffany left S.M. Entertainment in October 2017 and moved back to Los Angeles to pursue a solo career. Following the release of four non-album singles in 2018, Tiffany released her second extended play, Lips on Lips, in February 2019, which was supported by the lead singles "Born Again" and "Lips on Lips."

Extended plays

Singles

As lead artist

Promotional singles

Collaborations

As featured artist

Soundtrack appearances

Other charted songs

Music videos

Notes

See also 
 Girls' Generation discography
 Girls' Generation-TTS discography

References

Discographies of South Korean artists
Girls' Generation